NGC 1725 is a lenticular galaxy in the constellation Eridanus. The galaxy is listed in the New General Catalogue. It was discovered on November 10, 1885 by the astronomer Edward Emerson Barnard.

In 2009, a type Ia supernova was detected within NGC 1725. It was subsequently designated SN 2009F.

References

External links 
 

Eridanus (constellation)
Lenticular galaxies
1725
016488